The 1896 Albion football team was an American football team that represented Albion College in the 1896 college football season. Under first-year head coach and former star halfback F. J. Shipp, Albion compiled a 4–4 record, and were outscored by their opponents 124 to 67. In the Michigan Intercollegiate Athletic Conference, the team finished with a 2–1 record.

Schedule

References

Albion
Albion Britons football seasons
Albion football